This is a list of the terrestrial flora of the Houtman Abrolhos. Only vascular plants are listed — there have been some collections of mosses, liverworts and lichens from the Houtman Abrolhos, but no information has been published on these non-vascular groups.

The distribution of each species within each island group is provided. A list of islands is provided for species that occur on fewer than ten islands in a group; for species that occur on ten or more islands in a group, an island count is provided. Islands without a formally gazetted name are referred to by informal names, given in quotation marks.

A grey background indicates a naturalised species.



References

Flora of Western Australia
Houtman Abrolhos
Lists of plants of Australia
Lists of biota of Western Australia